The 2019 season saw Wigan Warriors compete in the Super League, Grand Final Playoffs, Challenge Cup, and the World Club Challenge.

Pre-season friendlies

World Club Challenge

Winners of the 2018 Super League Grand Final, Wigan Warriors qualified to play 2018 NRL champions Sydney Roosters in the 2019 World Club Challenge. Wigan were beaten by the Australian side, retaining the title for the NRL.

Super League

Matches 
Wigan's form was split through the season. The previous year's Grand Final champions start the season in poor form winning only once in their first six games. Form improved towards the middle of the season, before a surge of good results towards the end of the season – losing only once in the last three months. Wigan finished second in the league for the second year in a row.

League table

Grand Final Playoffs

Finishing second in the league, Wigan qualified for the Grand Final Play-offs. The Warriors won the qualifying final, but lost in the semifinal and the preliminary final to finish third in the play-off series.

Challenge Cup

As a "Super 8s" team of the 2018 Super League, Wigan Warriors entered the 2019 Challenge Cup in the sixth round where they we're subsequently knocked out by Warrington Wolves.

Transfers

In

Out

Loans Out

Squad

Notes

References

Wigan Warriors seasons
2019 in English rugby league
Super League XXIV by club